Vladimir Boisa or Vladimer Boisa (born July 4, 1981) is a Georgian former professional basketball player. Since 2013 he is the vice-president of Georgian Basketball Federation.

Professional career
Boisa has spent the most successful years of his career in Slovenia, where he played for Olimpija for the four seasons. During the last season with the club, Boisa participated in Euroleague, where his average stats were 15.8 points and 6.3 rebounds. He managed to score 28 points against Maccabi Tel Aviv during the season, which is the highest points he has ever scored in the competition.

Later he moved to Italy and joined Montepaschi Siena in 2005.

During his season-long spell in Greece with Aris Thessaloniki, Boisa averaged 4.1 points and 2.5 rebounds in the Greek Basket League.

The Georgian player has Liga ACB experience as well, as he played for Menorca Bàsquet during 2008-09 season, averaging 4 points and 2 rebound in 18 minutes of playing time. He was released by the club in February, 2009.

Boisa returned to Olimpija in 2010, having spent the only season for the club.

In 2012, during his final year of career Boisa moved again to Greece and joined Panionios. His last club was BC Armia in Georgian Superliga. He left the club at the start of year 2013 and decided to retire.

National team 
Vladimir Boisa played for the Georgia national team. He was one of the members of the team, which won FIBA EuroBasket 2009 Division B.

Boisa participated with his national team in Eurobasket 2011 as well, averaging 2.6 points per game.

Personal life 
Boisa is married to a Slovenian woman and has two children: a boy named Lian and a daughter named Naia.

Vladimer's brother Anatoli is also a basketball player. The brothers participated together for Georgia in Eurobasket in 2011.

Career statistics

EuroLeague

|-
| style="text-align:left;"| 2001–02
| style="text-align:left;"| KK Olimpija
| 8 || 3 || 8.1 || .357 || .143 || .900 || 1.1 || .0 || .4 || .1 || 2.8 || 0.8
|-
| style="text-align:left;"| 2002–03
| style="text-align:left;"| KK Olimpija
| 20 || 20 || 21.2 || .465 || .319 || .726 || 3.7 || .9 || .8 || .3 || 8.5 || 7.0
|-
| style="text-align:left;"| 2003–04
| style="text-align:left;"| KK Olimpija
| 19 || 18 || 27.5 || .453 || .349 || .623 || 3.0 || .9 || .6 || .3 || 9.3 || 5.7
|-
| style="text-align:left;"| 2004–05
| style="text-align:left;"| KK Olimpija
| 14 || 14 || 33.2 || .532 || .286 || .603 || 6.3 || .4 || .8 || .5 || 15.8 || 14.5
|-
| style="text-align:left;"| 2005–06
| style="text-align:left;"| Montepaschi Siena 
| 14 || 9 || 20.3 || .500 || .229 || .500 || 3.2 || .8 || .8 || .3 || 5.6 || 4.1
|-
| style="text-align:left;"| 2007–08
| style="text-align:left;"| Aris Thessaloniki 
| 10 || 3 || 16.0 || .278 || .500 || .429 || 2.2 || .7 || .1 || .2 || 3.4 || 2.7
|-
| style="text-align:left;"| 2010–11
| style="text-align:left;"| KK Olimpija
| 4 || 0 || 6.5 || .000 || .000 || .000 || .5 || .5 || .0 || .0 || .0 || .0
|- class="sortbottom"
| style="text-align:left;"| Career
| style="text-align:left;"|
| 89 || 67 || 20.9 || .476 || .312 || .636 || 3.3 || .7 || .6 || .1 || 7.9 || 6.1

References

External links
Profile at basketball-reference.com
ACB Profile
Euroleague official site player profile
Aris BC official site player profile in Greek or English

1981 births
Living people
ABA League players
Aris B.C. players
Bàsquet Manresa players
BC Spartak Primorye players
KD Slovan players
KK Olimpija players
KK Zadar players
Liga ACB players
Men's basketball players from Georgia (country)
Mens Sana Basket players
Panionios B.C. players
Slovenian men's basketball players
BC Rustavi players
Power forwards (basketball)